B&W International (Group) Holdings Limited is the fourth most popular shampoo manufacturer in China. Headquartered in Guangzhou, the company is engaged in the production of Chinese herbal medicine shampoo under the brand name Bawang. Jackie Chan, an international movie star, has been contracted to advertise Bawang Shampoo.

Its shares were listed on the Hong Kong Stock Exchange in 2009.

See also
 Duang

References

External links
Official website of B&W International

Companies listed on the Hong Kong Stock Exchange
Organizations established in 1989
Manufacturing companies based in Guangzhou
Privately held companies of China
Chinese brands
Shampoo brands